The Piper PA-29 Papoose was an American single-engined training monoplane designed by Piper, only one was built and the type did not enter production.

Development
In the late 1950s Piper began designing a two-seated (side-by-side) low-wing monoplane trainer built of fiberglass reinforced plastic construction. Originally intended to be powered by a  Continental O-200 piston engine, the prototype instead used a  Lycoming O-235-CIB piston engine. The prototype, registered N2900M first flew in 1962 but the type did not enter production. The Papoose prototype was on "permanent loan" to the EAA Museum at Oshkosh from 7/17/1973 until 6/25/1987 when it was returned to Lock Haven.  It currently resides in the Piper Aviation Museum in Lock Haven.

Specifications

References
Notes

Bibliography

Papoose
1960s United States civil trainer aircraft
Abandoned civil aircraft projects of the United States
Single-engined tractor aircraft
Low-wing aircraft
Aircraft first flown in 1962